General Admission is a live acoustic rock album by the Pat McGee Band released on June 15, 1999.  It was recorded live without overdubbing at The Bayou in Washington, D.C. and The Birchmere in Alexandria, Virginia.  It features ten songs from previous albums Revel and From the Wood.

Track listing

"The Story" 5:09
"Nobody Knows" 4:57
"Who Stole Her From Heaven" 4:41
"Flooding Both of Us" 8:42
"Could Have Been a Song" 5:27
"Pride" 6:00
"Can't Miss What You Never Had" 9:22
"Haven't Seen For a While" 5:10
"Straight Curve" 6:45
"Rebecca" 12:23

Personnel

Pat McGee - Acoustic Guitar, Electric Guitar, vocals
Al Walsh - Acoustic Guitar, Vocals
John Small - Bass
Chris Williams - drums
Jonathan Williams - Organ, Piano, Vocals
Chardy McEwan - percussion

Pat McGee Band albums
1999 live albums